Barrie—Simcoe—Bradford was a provincial electoral district in central Ontario, Canada that elected one Member of the Legislative Assembly of Ontario. It was created in 1999 from Simcoe Centre and a small part from Simcoe West. It was abolished in 2007 into Barrie, Simcoe—Grey and York—Simcoe.

The riding included the municipalities of Barrie, Innisfil and Bradford West Gwillimbury.

Members of Provincial Parliament
Joe Tascona, Ontario Progressive Conservative Party (1999–2007)

Provincial election results

Former provincial electoral districts of Ontario
Politics of Barrie